Pascale Grossenbacher (born 27 May 1978) is a Swiss former artistic gymnast. She competed at the 1996 Summer Olympics.

References

External links

1978 births
Living people
Swiss female artistic gymnasts
Gymnasts at the 1996 Summer Olympics
Olympic gymnasts of Switzerland
Place of birth missing (living people)
20th-century Swiss women